The 2018 Basildon Borough Council election took place on 3 May 2018 to elect members of Basildon Borough Council in Essex. This was on the same day as other local elections. The Conservative Party gained overall control of the council. which had previously been under no overall control and run by a coalition between UKIP, Labour and Independents.

After the election, the composition of the council was
Conservative 23
Labour 12
UKIP 5
Independent 2

Results summary

All comparisons in vote share are to the corresponding 2014 election.

Ward results

Billericay East

Billericay West

Burstead

Crouch

Fryerns

Laindon Park

Langdon Hills

Lee Chapel North

Nethermayne

Pitsea North West

Pitsea South East

Wickford Castledon

Wickford North

Wickford Park

References

2018 English local elections
2018
2010s in Essex